Un été à quatre mains is a French historical fiction novel by Gaëlle Josse about Franz Schubert.

The novel gives a fictionalized account of the time Schubert spent at Zseliz with the Esterházy family during the summer of 1828, and of his alleged unrequited love for the young countess Caroline von Esterházy.

References

External links 
 Babelio
 SensCritique

Novels about composers
2017 French novels